Timothy W. Lake (born December 27, 1959) is a television news anchor and historical narrative nonfiction author, currently at WTEN in Albany, New York. He was formerly the solo anchor of WCAU's NBC 10 News at 6 p.m. and co-anchor of NBC 10 News at 4 with Dawn Timmeney and NBC 10 News at 11 p.m. with Renee Chenault-Fattah.

Lake was the primary co-anchor at NBC 10 from March 2003 until December 7, 2012. Previously he was the co-anchor of NBC 10 News at Five and the noontime news with Chenault when WCAU-TV was owned by CBS. He joined WCAU in 1992. Prior to that he was the weekend anchor at KPRC-TV in Houston, Texas and the 11 pm weeknight anchor at South Carolina's highest rated TV station, CBS affiliate WCSC-TV in Charleston.

After leaving WCAU, Lake published three books, Henderson Harbor (2012), Association Island (2013), and Hang on and Fly, A Post-War Story of Plane Crash Tragedies, Heroism, and Survival (2015).   Hang on and Fly is about the early low-cost airlines of America and how one of many crashes among these upstart airlines led to the largest group of crash survivors stranded for a long time without rescue in North America.  The story features a Syrian-American who becomes a national hero, a stewardess who gets limited credit for her role among the survivors because of her gender, and a simple farmer's wife who helps rescue the survivors while keeping a deadly secret of her own. It also features America's top plane crash investigator who makes the first visit to a commercial airlines crash.  The story reveals that some of the survivors stole money from the dead.

Lake began working for daily and weekly newspapers while attending State University of New York at Fredonia. He concurrently worked for commercial radio stations in Buffalo and Dunkirk, New York, in addition to the campus station, WCVF-FM.

He has also worked for several newspapers: The Walton (New York) Reporter, 1978–1981; The Jamestown (New York) Post-Journal, 1981–1982; The North Myrtle Beach Times (South Carolina), 1982-1983. He has also worked at a number of other radio and television stations, including: WCVF, Fredonia, NY; WZIR, Buffalo-Niagara Falls, NY; WDOE, Dunkirk, NY; WNMB, North Myrtle Beach, SC; KPRC-TV, Houston, TX. Lake has covered news events throughout New York State, North and South Carolina, Texas and Mexico, Washington, DC, Pennsylvania, New Jersey, and Delaware. He has won numerous awards for newspaper writing and radio and television reporting and is the tenth child in a family of thirteen.

Lake has published for Arcadia Books and what appears to be his own company, Lake Publishing.  He's also written long-form historical articles for The Buffalo News, Pittsburgh Post-Gazette, Jamestown Post-Journal, and for Thousand Islands Life magazine.

The Broadcast Pioneers of Philadelphia inducted Lake into its Hall of Fame in 2011.

References 

1959 births
Living people
Television anchors from Philadelphia
Philadelphia television reporters
State University of New York at Fredonia alumni
People from Jefferson County, New York
People from Ellisburg, New York